Johnny Watts (27 September 1883 – 25 July 1952) was an  Australian rules footballer who played with St Kilda in the Victorian Football League (VFL).

Notes

External links 

1883 births
1952 deaths
Australian rules footballers from Victoria (Australia)
St Kilda Football Club players
Prahran Football Club players